Xylophanes marginalis is a moth of the  family Sphingidae. It is known from Brazil, Paraguay and Argentina.

The length of the forewings is about 26 mm for males and 31 mm for females. It is similar to Xylophanes tyndarus but shorter-winged and with differences in the forewing pattern. The first postmedian line on the forewing upperside is less oblique and placed closer to the antemedian lines. The apical dash is absent.

Adults are probably on wing year-round.

The larvae possibly feed on Psychotria panamensis, Psychotria nervosa and Pavonia guanacastensis.

References

marginalis
Moths described in 1917